Jane Fraser may refer to:

 Jane Fraser, pen-name of Rosamunde Pilcher (1924−2019)
 Jane Fraser (philanthropy) (born 1942), president of the Stuttering Foundation of America
 Jane Fraser (executive) (born 1967), CEO of Citigroup